Frederick Charles Maisey (1825-1892) was a 19th-century English officer, archaeological surveyor and painter, active in India. His main painting technique was pen and ink, and watercolour. He was a Lieutenant in the British Army circa 1850 in the Bengal Native Infantry, and participated to the British exploration of India.

Masey was in charge of the excavation of Sanchi in 1851. In 1852 he also made the earliest painting of the Temples at Khajuraho.

Masey later became a British Army General on December 1, 1888.

Maysey had a son, also named Frederick Charles Maisey, born on 7 July 1851, who became Lieutenant-Colonel in the British Army.

Works
 Sánchi and its remains : a full description of the ancient buildings, sculptures, and inscriptions at Sánchi, near Bhilsa, in Central India, with remarks on the evidence they supply as to the comparatively modern date of the Buddhism of Gotama, or Sákya Muni

See also
 List of British Army full generals

References

1825 births
1892 deaths
British Army generals